Urila is a locality in the Queanbeyan-Palerang Region, New South Wales, Australia. It is a rural residential area located to the east of Burra.

References

Localities in New South Wales
Queanbeyan–Palerang Regional Council
Southern Tablelands